Daniel Gimeno Traver (born 7 August 1985) is a professional Spanish tennis player who turned pro in 2004, when he was eighteen years old. He reached the final of Casablanca in 2015 and has won 12 Challenger Tour events, achieving a career-high singles ranking of World No. 48 in March 2013.

Personal life 
Daniel Gimeno Traver was born 7 August 1985 in Valencia, Spain. He is the son of Javier, a chemist, and Marisol, a nurse, and is the second of four brothers, Carlos, Miguel and Víctor being his siblings.

Tennis career 
Gimeno Traver started playing tennis at the age of 2. He prefers to play on clay and is currently coached by Israel Sevilla.

Juniors 
As a junior, he won the European Championships in 2003 beating Marcos Baghdatis in Switzerland. Gimeno Traver won a further 5 junior titles, compiling a singles win–loss record of 51–10 and reaching as high as No. 4 in the junior world rankings in May 2003. He also beat Novak Djokovic on the way to a quarter-final place at Roland Garros, losing to Jo-Wilfried Tsonga.

Junior Slam results:

Australian Open: -
French Open: QF (2003)
Wimbledon: 1R (2003)
US Open: 3R (2003)

Pro tour
Gimeno Traver reached ATP World Tour semifinals at Stuttgart and Gstaad in 2010, St. Petersburg in 2012 and Oeiras in 2014. His best Grand Slam performance was at the 2010 US Open, when he beat Jarkko Nieminen and Jérémy Chardy to reach the third round.

At the 2015 Grand Prix Hassan II, Gimeno Traver defeated seeded players Mikhail Kukushkin and Jiří Veselý to reach his first ATP 250 final, where he lost to Martin Kližan.

Coaching
Gimeno Traver has coached Roberto Bautista Agut since the start of the 2022 season. With him, Bautista Agut has won 2 titles and reached a further 2 finals.

ATP career finals

Singles: 1 (1 runner-up)

Doubles: 2 (1 title, 1 runner-up)

Challenger career finals

Singles (14–11)

Runners-up

Doubles (3–6)

Runners-up

Performance timelines 

''Current till 2018 Wimbledon Championships.

Singles

Doubles

Wins over top 10 players
He has a 3–20 (.130) record against players who were, at the time the match was played, ranked in the top 10.

References

External links 

 
 
 Gimeno Traver recent match results 
 Gimeno Traver World ranking history
 

1985 births
Living people
Sportspeople from Valencia
Spanish male tennis players
Tennis players from the Valencian Community